Béla Szepes (né Strauch; 5 September 1903, Igló – June 20, 1986, Budapest) was a Hungarian skier, athlete, graphic designer and journalist. He competed at the 1924 Winter Olympics and won the silver medal in the javelin throw in the 1928 Summer Olympics. He captured seven Hungarian Athletics Championships and three British Athletics Championships titles.

Later Szepes had a successful career as a graphic artist, becoming an influential sports cartoonist in Hungary.

Early life and sporting career

Szepes was born in Igló, Austria-Hungary (today Spišská Nová Ves, Slovakia) in 1903 and began skiing by the Magyar Turista Egylet in 1918. Five years later he became the first ever Hungarian champion in ski jumping on a hill that was built by the jumpers themselves. He broke the Hungarian record in ski jumping six times during his career, having set his personal best in 1927 with 57 metres.

At the 1924 Winter Olympics he participated in the 18 kilometre cross-country skiing event and in the Nordic combined but did not finish either of the races.

Between 1919 and 1931 he was the athlete of Magyar Atétikai Club (MAC), competing in javelin throw. One of the most successful javelin thrower of his time, he won the Hungarian championships seven times in a row from 1925 to 1931. Szepes also set five national records during this period, having achieved his best in 1930 with 66.70 metres. He also regularly participated at the British Athletics Championships, winning the event on three occasions (1925, 1927, 1929).

In 1928 he was present at the Summer Olympics in Amsterdam, where he came second behind Erik Lundqvist with 65.26 metres.

Later life
Szepes studied at the University of Arts and Design in Budapest. Following his graduation in 1926, Szepes moved to Berlin where he worked for several papers as a journalist and cartoonist. He returned to Hungary in 1933 and took a ski instructor job, was the coach of the Hungarian athletics team between 1938–1941 and also contributed to Nemzeti Sport (1933–1941) and later to Képes Sport (1941–1944) as a reporter and editor.

After World War II he continued his career as a freelance graphic artist; his drawings and caricatures were published in Népsport, Ludas Matyi and Füles, and made a number of book illustrations. From the 1960s he turned to sculpting and designed sports awards and trophies. Among his notable works are the trophy of the Athletic European Cup made in 1965 and the Fair Play Award of West Germany from 1972. His creations were displayed in many cities around the globe, including Dresden, Munich, Rotterdam and Montreal.

Szepes died in Budapest in 1986. His caricatures, graphics and posters are on display in the Physical Education and Sports Museum in Budapest, Hungary.

Personal life
Béla Szepes met his wife Mária in 1925, and the two were married on December 24, 1930. The couple had one son, who died when he was seven months old.

References

External links
Profile at Database Olympics
 Lambiek Comiclopedia article.

Hungarian male cross-country skiers
Hungarian male Nordic combined skiers
Hungarian male ski jumpers
Hungarian male javelin throwers
Hungarian journalists
Hungarian caricaturists
Hungarian cartoonists
Olympic cross-country skiers of Hungary
Olympic Nordic combined skiers of Hungary
Olympic athletes of Hungary
Cross-country skiers at the 1924 Winter Olympics
Nordic combined skiers at the 1924 Winter Olympics
Athletes (track and field) at the 1928 Summer Olympics
Olympic silver medalists for Hungary
Hungarians in Slovakia
Sportspeople from Spišská Nová Ves
1903 births
1986 deaths
20th-century Hungarian sculptors
Medalists at the 1928 Summer Olympics
Olympic silver medalists in athletics (track and field)
20th-century journalists